Johnson Barn may refer to:

in the United States
(by state)
Johnson Barn (Fayetteville, Arkansas) listed on the National Register of Historic Places in Washington County, Arkansas
Louis Johnson Barn, Richfield, Idaho, listed on the National Register of Historic Places in Lincoln County, Idaho
Thomas Johnson Polygonal Barn, Wellman, Iowa, listed on the National Register of Historic Places in Washington County, Idaho
Johnson Barn (Mobridge, South Dakota), listed on the National Register of Historic Places in Walworth County, South Dakota